Mamma Gógó is a 2010 Icelandic drama film directed by Friðrik Þór Friðriksson. The film was selected as the Icelandic entry for the Best Foreign Language Film at the 83rd Academy Awards, but did not make the final shortlist.

Cast
 Kristbjörg Kjeld as Mamma Gógó
 Hilmir Snær Guðnason as The director
 Gunnar Eyjólfsson as Gógó's deceased husband
 Margrét Vilhjálmsdóttir as The director's wife
 Ólafía Hrönn Jónsdóttir as The director's sister 1
 Inga Maria Valdimarsdóttir as The director's sister 2
 Jóhann Sigurðarson as The bank manager
 Bjarni Ingvarsson as The Farmer

See also
 List of submissions to the 83rd Academy Awards for Best Foreign Language Film
 List of Icelandic submissions for the Academy Award for Best Foreign Language Film

References

External links

2010 films
2010s Icelandic-language films
2010 drama films
Films directed by Friðrik Þór Friðriksson
Films scored by Hilmar Örn Hilmarsson
Icelandic drama films